The Riviere-du-Loup Promutel were a Canadian semi-professional ice hockey team in Rivière-du-Loup, Quebec. They played in the Quebec Semi-Pro Hockey League from 2001-2004. They folded in 2004 due to financial difficulties.

Notable players
Link Gaetz

External links
 The Internet Hockey Database

Ice hockey teams in Quebec
Quebec Semi-Pro Hockey League teams
Sport in Rivière-du-Loup
Ice hockey clubs established in 2001
2001 establishments in Quebec
2004 disestablishments in Quebec
Ice hockey clubs disestablished in 2004